William Ashley may refer to:

 William Ashley (economic historian) (1860–1927), English economic historian
 Bill Ashley (politician) (1881–1958), Australian politician
 William Henry Ashley (1778–1838), American fur trader, entrepreneur, and politician
 Gobo Ashley (William Hare Ashley, 1862–1930), South African cricketer
 Billy Ashley (born 1970), American baseball player

See also 
 William Ashley-Brown (1880–1970), Australian Anglican priest
 William Ashley-Cooper (1803–1877), MP for Dorchester